Sir William Murray Jardine is the 13th Baronet of Applegirth, Dumfriesshire. He is the 24th Chief of Clan Jardine. He is also President of the Jardine Clan Society.   

Murray Jardine was born on 4 July 1984.  He is the son of Sir Alexander Maule Jardine of Applegirth, 12th Bt and Mary Beatrice Cross. He succeeded to the title in 2008.

See also
Jardine baronets

References

1984 births
Living people
People educated at Strathallan School
Baronets in the Baronetage of Nova Scotia
Scottish clan chiefs